Álvaro Peña Herrero (born 24 October 1991) is a Spanish professional footballer who plays mainly as a central midfielder for Dutch club Almere City.

Club career
Born in Bilbao, Biscay, Peña joined local Athletic Bilbao's youth system in 2006, aged 15. After appearing for farm team CD Basconia, he went on to spend two full seasons with the B side in Segunda División B.

Peña made his debut with the main squad on 28 November 2012, starting in a 2–0 away win against Hapoel Ironi Kiryat Shmona F.C. in the group stage of the UEFA Europa League. He scored two goals in 34 matches for the reserves in his last year, playoffs included.

On 3 July 2013, Peña signed a two-year contract with Segunda División club CD Lugo. He made his league debut on 17 August, playing 65 minutes in a 0–0 home draw against CD Numancia, and scored his first goal as a professional on 19 October by netting his team's second in a 3–3 draw at Recreativo de Huelva.

On 1 September 2015, Peña joined Racing de Santander of division three on a two-year deal. On 5 July 2017, he returned to the second tier after agreeing to a two-year contract at AD Alcorcón.

On 17 January 2019, Peña signed a two-and-a-half-year contract with Albacete Balompié, still in the second division. On 2 September, he moved to CD Mirandés of the same league on loan for the season.

Upon returning, Peña was a regular starter for Alba as they suffered relegation. On 21 July 2021, he joined second-division newcomers SD Amorebieta.

On 25 August 2022, Peña signed a one-year contract (with an option to extend) with Almere City in the Dutch second-tier Eerste Divisie.

References

External links

1991 births
Living people
Spanish footballers
Footballers from Bilbao
Association football midfielders
Segunda División players
Segunda División B players
Tercera División players
CD Basconia footballers
Athletic Bilbao footballers
Bilbao Athletic footballers
CD Lugo players
Racing de Santander players
AD Alcorcón footballers
Albacete Balompié players
CD Mirandés footballers
SD Amorebieta footballers
Almere City FC players
Spanish expatriate footballers
Expatriate footballers in the Netherlands
Spanish expatriate sportspeople in the Netherlands